Nikkaluokta is a Swedish Sami village in Norrbotten County. The village belongs to Gällivare Municipality, bordering Kiruna Municipality, the closest urban area some 60 kilometers away. In its vicinity lie the areas of two Sami communities, Laevas and Girjas, who still herd semi-domesticated reindeer in the region.

Nikkaluokta has a mountain lodge, complete with a small grocery store and restaurant, a chapel, and, during the summer months, a commercial helicopter base. It is a popular starting point for several hiking and skiing trails in the Kebnekaise area, including the notable Kungsleden. On foot, it takes around five hours to travel the 19 kilometer distance between the two mountain lodges in Nikkaluokta and Kebnekaise.

Nikkaluokta is sited in the centre of three valleys, where the tarmac road from Kiruna Municipality ends. To travel farther, trails and mountain paths of varying size and condition must be used. Nikkaluokta Bay in Lake Ladtjojaure is also the starting point for the water route into scenic Vistas Valley.

Image gallery

Climate
Nikkaluokta has an arctic climate (Dfc) since only one month exceeding means above 10 degrees with long and very cold winters followed by short summers with moderate temperatures and perpetual daylight to the midnight sun/polar night-circle. Considering its far northerly latitudes, winters are less extreme than on similar latitudes elsewhere in the world, but temperatures below  are not infrequent, as are yearly frosts during the midnight sun period, with May lows averaging below freezing.

References

Tourist attractions in Norrbotten County
Populated places in Gällivare Municipality
Lapland (Sweden)
Kebnekaise